Lia Williams (born 26 November 1964) is an English actress and director, known for stage, film, and television appearances. She is noted for her role as Wallis Simpson in The Crown.

Theatre career

Williams's breakthrough performance came in 1991 when she appeared in The Revengers' Comedies, for which she won the Critics' Circle Theatre Award for Most Promising Newcomer and an Olivier Award nomination for Best Comedy Performance.  In 1993, she created the role of Carol in the London production of David Mamet's Oleanna. In 1997, Williams appeared opposite Michael Gambon in London's West End and on Broadway in David Hare's Skylight, (Olivier and Tony Award nominations). In 2001, Williams appeared again in the West End and on Broadway, playing Ruth in Harold Pinter's The Homecoming. Her long standing collaboration with Harold Pinter included roles in The Collection, Celebration, The Room, The Lover, The Hothouse and Old Times.

Other leading theatre performances include Rosalind in As You Like It for the RSC, Alan Ayckbourn's Absurd Person Singular, Henryk Ibsen's The Lady from the Sea, and Pinter's Old Times, in which she alternated the roles of Anna and Kate with Kristin Scott Thomas.

As Clytemnestra in Robert Icke's 'Oresteia' Williams was nominated for both Olivier and Evening Standard Awards. Also for Robert Icke, she alternated the roles of Elizabeth I and Mary Stuart with Juliet Stevenson in 'Mary Stuart'.

In 2019, she played the role of Hannah Jelkes in the West End theatre production of Tennessee Williams' The Night of the Iguana at the Noel Coward Theatre opposite Clive Owen.

In Dublin, Williams appeared at the Gate Theatre as Alma in The Eccentricities of a Nightingale and Blanche du Bois in Tennessee Williams' A Streetcar Named Desire. She won The Irish Times best Actress Award for both roles.

Film and television

In 1993, Williams made her film debut in Michael Winner's Dirty Weekend. Winner chose her after seeing her in an Alan Ayckbourn play. Subsequent film appearances have included supporting roles in Firelight (1997), Shot Through the Heart (1998), The King Is Alive (2000), Girl from Rio (2001), and The Christmas Miracle of Jonathan Toomey (2007).

Leading television roles include Seaforth starring Williams and Linus Roache, The Russian Bride opposite Sheila Hancock and Douglas Hodge and the ITV comedy drama series Doc Martin with Martin Clunes.

Williams played the lead role in May 33rd for the BBC for which she won a FIPA Award for Best Actress and was nominated for a BAFTA.

She played Wallis, Duchess of Windsor in the Netflix series The Crown, Nadia Herz in the second series of The Missing and starred in Kiri, a Channel 4 series, alongside Sarah Lancashire and Steven Mackintosh. Most recently she has played Dr Cooper in His Dark Materials and DSU Gemma Garland in the BBC six-part mystery thriller The Capture.

Director

Williams has been directing short films since 2002, her debut being Feathers (2002), which was based on a short story by Raymond Carver. In 2008, her short film The Stronger (2007) was nominated for the Best Short Film at the BAFTA Film Awards, and won Best Short Film at Raindance. In 2009, Williams directed Dog Alone, a dialogue-free short film which was broadcast as part of British Sky Broadcasting's Ten Minute Tales season. In 2016 she directed Nanabozhung, a feature-length documentary about the Batchewana First Nations, Canada.

On stage, she has also directed The Matchbox by Frank McGuinness for Liverpool Playhouse and the Tricycle Theatre and Ashes to Ashes as part of the Harold Pinter Season in the West End (2019).

In 2021, Williams directed an acclaimed production of Doubt by John Patrick Shanley at Chichester Festival Theatre, West Sussex.

Personal life
Lia Williams lives in Portobello, London.

Work

Selected stage credits

Selected television credits

Selected filmography

References

External links

1964 births
English stage actresses
English television actresses
English film actresses
English film directors
Living people
People from Birkenhead
20th-century English actresses
21st-century English actresses